Guyuan Liupanshan Airport  is an airport serving Guyuan, a city in Ningxia Hui Autonomous Region, China.  It is located in Zhonghe Township,  from the city center.  The airport cost 458 million yuan to build and started operation on 26 June 2010.

Airlines and destinations

See also
List of airports in China
List of the busiest airports in China

References

External links
 China West Airport Group

Airports in Ningxia
Airports established in 2010
2010 establishments in China